Signal Peak, with an elevation of , is the highest peak in the Pine Valley Mountains and in Washington County in southwestern Utah, United States. Signal Peak is located north of the city of St. George and south of the community of Pine Valley in the Dixie National Forest. The summit is the highest point in the Pine Valley Mountain Wilderness.

Signal Peak is in the watershed of tributaries of the Virgin River, which itself is a tributary of the Colorado River.

A trail to the top can be found at Oak Grove campground near the neighboring city of Leeds, Utah.

References

External links

Dixie National Forest
Mountains of Washington County, Utah
Mountains of Utah